A rasp is a tool used for shaping wood or other material.

Rasp or RASP may also refer to:

 Reactive aldehyde species
Ranger Assessment and Selection Program, the United States Army Rangers selection and training
 RASP computing model, random-access stored-program machine
 The Rasp, a book by Philip MacDonald
 Residents Against SARP Pollution
 Runtime application self-protection